Pelado Hill, from Spanish , also known as Pelado Peak, is an extinct volcano located  SE from Cañas (canton).

Toponymy 

 translates to bare or naked, in this case, lack of forest canopy.

Physical aspects 

Extinct for millions of years and highly eroded, the skeletal structure of the volcano caldera can still be appreciated. There is secondary activity nearby with hot springs and minerals.

Social and economic activity  

Social networks such as Instagram and their influencers promoted the area due to the photogenic nature of the place.

See also 
List of volcanoes in Costa Rica

References

Stratovolcanoes of Costa Rica
Mountains of Costa Rica
Geography of Limón Province